Stomatopora is a genus of bryozoans belonging to the family Stomatoporidae.

The genus has cosmopolitan distribution.

Species:

Stomatopora antarctica 
Stomatopora antiqua 
Stomatopora bajocensis 
Stomatopora bifurca 
Stomatopora bilix 
Stomatopora cellisalternans 
Stomatopora coarctata 
Stomatopora compressa 
Stomatopora contracta 
Stomatopora corallina 
Stomatopora cornu 
Stomatopora dichotoma 
Stomatopora dichotoma 
Stomatopora dichotomoides 
Stomatopora divaricata 
Stomatopora dubia 
Stomatopora eburnea 
Stomatopora elevata 
Stomatopora excavans 
Stomatopora exigua 
Stomatopora fasciculata 
Stomatopora fasciolata 
Stomatopora filiformis 
Stomatopora filiformis 
Stomatopora geminata 
Stomatopora gingrina 
Stomatopora gippslandi 
Stomatopora gracilis 
Stomatopora granulata 
Stomatopora gregoryi 
Stomatopora hemmoorensis 
Stomatopora hirsuta 
Stomatopora illiesae 
Stomatopora illiesi 
Stomatopora irregularis 
Stomatopora kashpirica 
Stomatopora kuemmelli 
Stomatopora linearis 
Stomatopora macroura 
Stomatopora maeandrina 
Stomatopora melvillei 
Stomatopora miniscula 
Stomatopora minuta 
Stomatopora minuta 
Stomatopora nagalurensis 
Stomatopora opposita 
Stomatopora osterfeldi 
Stomatopora papillosa 
Stomatopora parnensis 
Stomatopora parvipora 
Stomatopora parvula 
Stomatopora parvula 
Stomatopora pedicellata 
Stomatopora polygona 
Stomatopora pratti 
Stomatopora recurva 
Stomatopora regularis 
Stomatopora reticulata 
Stomatopora richardsoni 
Stomatopora rugosa 
Stomatopora rupellensis 
Stomatopora semierecta 
Stomatopora siluriana 
Stomatopora simplicissima 
Stomatopora spatiosa 
Stomatopora spicea 
Stomatopora striatula 
Stomatopora subdivaricata 
Stomatopora subgracilis 
Stomatopora taurinensis 
Stomatopora tenuisa 
Stomatopora thalassae 
Stomatopora trahens 
Stomatopora undulata 
Stomatopora waltoni 
Stomatopora watersi

References

Bryozoan genera